Indonesia participated in the 2010 Summer Youth Olympics (14–26 August) in Singapore with 14 athletes. The team competed in a total of seven sports: archery, badminton, cycling, swimming, taekwondo, tennis, and weightlifting. According to the head of the national contingent, Ade Lukman, athlete training was conducted by individual managers of each sport. All athletes were gathered in Jakarta on 6 August for a cultural training session.

The Indonesian government allocated 120 million rupiah (US$13,200) for monthly expenses used for preparations for the games. Each athlete received Rp 2.5 million a month and Rp 150,000 a day for lodging, as well as Rp 150,000 a month for daily expenses. Each coach and manager received Rp 5 million a month. Funding was approved in early July after a request was filed in May. Djoko Pramono, the team's chief manager, criticized the government for the delay in funding, which was received only one month prior to the games. Athletes and other officials of the national team were sent off at a ceremony attended by Rita Subowo, Chairwoman of the National Sports Committee of Indonesia, on 10 August. Although the team did not set a target for any medals, they expected good results from badminton and weightlifting.

Medalists

Archery

Erwina Safitri, the nation's lone representative in archery, was given a wild card berth by the International Archery Federation.

Girls

Mixed Team

Badminton

Evert Sukamta and Renna Suwarno, both 18 years old, are the nation's representatives in badminton. Sukamta earned his berth in the Olympics after finishing in the top five in the boys' singles event of the 2010 Asian Junior Badminton Championships in Kuala Lumpur. Suwarno, on the other hand, did not qualify for the quarterfinals but was given the opportunity to complete after the Chinese team exceeded its maximum quota of two players per nation when three of its players placed in the top five of the championships. No other Indonesian players qualified after the national team's poor performance at the 2010 BWF World Junior Championships in Guadalajara, the final qualifying event for the Singapore games. National team badminton trainer Ronny Agustinus believed the greatest threat in their path toward the medals was the Chinese team, who were evenly matched with Indonesia at the youth level.

Sukamta played in pool B in the preliminary round of the boys' singles tournament. He defeated his first opponent, Kento Horiuchi of Japan, on 15 August in three sets with scores 21–7, 14–21, 21–13. Later in the evening, Sukamta defeated Irfan Djabar of Suriname in straight sets 21–4, 21–10. His success was replicated by Suwarno in pool D of the girls' singles tournament, defeating Victoria Cheng of New Zealand in straight sets 21–15, 21–5, and Katherine Winder of Peru with scores 21–9, 21–12. Sukamta won his final preliminary round match on 16 August, defeating Henry Pan of Canada in straight sets 21–17, 21–13. By winning all three preliminary matches and placing first in his pool, Sukamta proceeded into the quarterfinals. Suwarno, on the other hand, failed to mount a comeback and lost her third preliminary match against China's Deng Xuan 11–21, 20–22. She did not advance into the final rounds of the tournament after placing second in her pool.

In the quarterfinal round of the boys' tournament on 17 August, Sukamta faced number 1 seed Kang Ji-wook of South Korea. He lost the first set 11–21 but came back to win the second set 21–14. In the third set, Sukamta was not able to adapt to Kang's change in playing tempo and succumbed to his opponent 13–21. The match took 47 minutes to complete.

Boys

Girls

Cycling

Four cyclists are sent as the nation's representatives in cycling. Suherman Heryadi, Destian Satria, and Ongky Setiawan were given berths by the Union Cycliste Internationale "based on their achievements this season" during the final allocation of unused quota places. Elga Kharisma Novanda, the only female member of the team, earned her qualification after placing second in the BMX event of the 2010 Singapore Mountain Bike Carnival at Tampines Bike Park.

On 17 August, Kharisma Novanda competed in the girls'  cross country race and placed 13th, finishing 8 minutes and 27 seconds behind race leader Karolina Kalasova of the Czech Republic. In the boys' cross country race, Destian Satria finished in 28th place and was lapped with 3 laps to go by leader Jhonnatan Botero of Colombia.

Cross Country

Time Trial

BMX

Road Race

Overall

Swimming

Ratna Marita finished 16th overall in the heats of the girls' 200-metre individual medley on 15 August and did not advance into the final round. She finished the swim two seconds slower than her personal best and attributed the loss to over-preparation and a difficult training schedule. Marita will compete at the 2010 Asian Games in November. Patricia Hapsari competed in the girls' 100-metre freestyle on 16 August and placed first in the third heat. Her time of 58.85 seconds improved on her personal best of 59.90 seconds. However, Hapsari did not qualify for the next round as her result placed her 24th overall in the heats.

Boys

Girls

Taekwondo

Macho Hungan, the nation's lone representative in taekwondo, was given a wild card berth by the World Taekwondo Federation.

Tennis

Grace Sari Ysidora is the nation's lone representative in tennis. Ysidora was previously ranked in the world's top 40; she received a wild card berth in the Singapore games from the International Tennis Federation after a request was filed by Martina Wijaya, the chairwoman of Indonesia's national tennis association. Ysidora was eliminated from the girls' singles tournament on 15 August in the first round match against Denisa Allertova of the Czech Republic in straight sets 3–6, 2–6. Allertova, who played with greater power than Ysidora, was able to find a weakness by consistently forcing her to return the ball with the forehand.

Girls

Weightlifting

Zainudin and Dewi Safitri are the nation's representatives in weightlifting. Sumariyanto had been one of Indonesia's representatives, but he did not meet the age requirement of the competition despite finishing third in the men's 56 kg event at the 2009 World Youth Weightlifting Championships in Chiang Mai. Zainudin, who placed first in the men's 62 kg event at the national championships, was selected by the Indonesian Weightlifting, Bodybuilding and Powerlifting Association to replace him. Dewi Safitri secured her berth after finishing third in the women's 53 kg event at the 2009 Asian Youth Weightlifting Championships in Tashkent.

Both lifters competed on 16 August. Safitri, who competed against eight other weightlifters, placed third in the girls' 53 kg event and won Indonesia its first medal, the bronze. Safitri had failed to execute her first and third snatch lifts and the first clean and jerk lift. During training in the week prior to the competition, she had lifted a combined , leading weightlifting coach Sodikin to believe the result was not her best performance. Despite this, the bronze medal fulfilled Safitri's promise of bringing home a medal in time for the annual celebration of Indonesia's independence, which falls on 17 August. Zainudin competed against 12 other athletes and ranked fifth in the boys' 62 kg event.

Boys

Girls

See also
Indonesia at the Olympics

References

External links
Competitors List: Indonesia

2010 in Indonesian sport
Nations at the 2010 Summer Youth Olympics
Indonesia at the Youth Olympics